Wendy Pullan may refer to:
Wendy Pullan (rower) (born 1953), Canadian rower
Wendy Pullan (academic), scholar of architecture and urban studies